XHIKE-FM is a community radio station on 89.1 FM in Salina Cruz, Oaxaca. It is known as Radio Activa and owned by the civil association Ike Siidi Viaa, A.C.

History

XHIKE is the oldest of the three licensed community radio stations in the Istmo Region. The award of its concession was approved on December 14, 2016. When the award was made public in early 2017, the name of the station was announced at the time as Radio IKE, later changing to Radio Activa. The station launched on March 16, 2017.

References

Radio stations in Oaxaca
Community radio stations in Mexico
Radio stations established in 2017